Orange Beach Middle & High School is a public middle and high school in Orange Beach, Alabama, United States. It is part of the Baldwin County School District.

History
In 2017, the Baldwin County School Board voted to build a new high school for Orange Beach.

The school, which was established with funds from both the city and the county school district, began construction in May 2018. Because Gulf Shores High School, previously of the county school district, separated in 2019, the county temporarily had portable classrooms for Orange Beach and students in unincorporated areas previously zoned to Gulf Shores who wanted to immediately begin attending Baldwin County schools instead of staying with the now-independent Gulf Shores schools.
The complex as a whole had a cost of $34 million, with $10 million to the auditorium. On August 10, 2020, the school held its opening ceremony.

The school mascot is the Mako and the school colors are orange and blue.

References

External links
 Orange Beach Middle & High School

Public high schools in Alabama
Public middle schools in Alabama
2020 establishments in Alabama
Educational institutions established in 2020
Schools in Baldwin County, Alabama